Choanephora infundibulifera is a species of fungus in the family Choanephoraceae. It is a plant pathogen.

See also
 List of soybean diseases

References

Fungi described in 1873
Fungal plant pathogens and diseases
Zygomycota
Soybean diseases